Luxoft, a DXC Technology Company, is represented in 21 countries with 17 000+ employees globally. Luxoft is headquartered in Zug, Switzerland.

History
In 2000, Luxoft was established under the direction of Dmitry Loschinin in Russia. In 2008, it acquired ITC Networks in Bucharest. In 2013, Luxoft was listed on the New York Stock Exchange, following an initial public offering of 4.1 million shares at $17.00 per ordinary share. UBS Limited, Credit Suisse Securities (USA) LLC, J.P. Morgan Securities LLC, VTB Capital plc and Cowen and Company, LLC were the joint book-running managers for the offering. In January 2019, Luxoft was acquired by DXC Technology. Luxoft enabled Switzerland's first Blockchain based e-vote platform with the City of Zug and Hochschule Luzern's Blockchain Lab. In 2010, Luxoft established a development center in Kraków, Poland. Since 2018, Luxoft has been present in Italy (Turin), through the acquisition of the Objective Software site. In January 2019, DXC Technologie of Tyson Corner (Virginia) announced the acquisition of Luxoft Holding.

Luxoft’s largest offices are based in the US, Poland, Germany, Ukraine, Singapore, and Serbia.

Acquisitions 

In January 2019, Luxoft was acquired by DXC Technology. According to the information from SEC database, DXC Technology now owns 83% of Luxoft shares. The eventual close of the deal was in June 2019.

References

Software companies of Switzerland
Companies listed on the New York Stock Exchange
Multinational companies headquartered in Switzerland
Consulting firms established in 2000
Software companies established in 2000
International information technology consulting firms